Blue Gap Boy'z is a 2008 independent comedy film written and directed by Holt Hamilton. Blue Gap Boy'z was filmed primarily in Phoenix, Arizona, as well as on the Navajo Nation in Blue Gap, Arizona.

Cast
 Ernest "Ernie" David Tsosie III as James Nez
 Vincent Craig as Jessie Nez
 James Bilagody as Jodie Nez
 Beau Benally as Frankie B.
 Sallie Glaner Braden as Sara
 Horst W. Aschmann as Rolf
 Guilty Wilson as Mystic Love
 Jana Mashonee as herself
 Deshava Apachee as Mr. Big Extra Tough Guy

See also
 Turquoise Rose
 Pete & Cleo
 Jana Mashonee, a Lumbee/Tuscarora singer and actress
 James and Ernie, a Navajo comedy duo

External links
 Holt Hamilton Productions

2008 films
Navajo-language films
2008 comedy films
Films about Native Americans
Films set in Blue Gap, Arizona
Films set on the Navajo Nation
Films shot in Arizona
American comedy films
2000s English-language films
2000s American films